The 1998–99 European Challenge Cup was the third year of the European Challenge Cup, the second tier rugby union cup competition below the Heineken Cup. The tournament was held between September 1998 and February 1999

Pool stage

Pool 1

Pool 2

Pool 3

Knockout stage

Quarter-finals

Semi-finals

Final

See also

European Challenge Cup
1998–99 Heineken Cup

 
1998–99 rugby union tournaments for clubs
1998-99
1998–99 in European rugby union
1998–99 in English rugby union
1998–99 in French rugby union
1998–99 in Irish rugby union
1998–99 in Italian rugby union
1998–99 in Romanian rugby union
1998–99 in Welsh rugby union
1998 in Spanish sport
rugby union
rugby union